The 1988–89 Czechoslovak Extraliga season was the 46th season of the Czechoslovak Extraliga, the top level of ice hockey in Czechoslovakia. 12 teams participated in the league, and VSZ Kosice won the championship.

Regular season

Playoffs

Quarterfinal 
Tesla Pardubice – CHZ Litvínov 4:3 (4:1,0:1,0:1)
Tesla Pardubice – CHZ Litvínov 9:5 (4:2,3:2,2:1)
CHZ Litvínov – Tesla Pardubice 6:7 PP (1:3,3:2,2:1,0:1)
Dukla Trenčín – Motor České Budějovice 4:3 (2:1,2:2,0:0)
Dukla Trenčín – Motor České Budějovice 2:3 (0:3,2:0,0:0)
Motor České Budějovice – Dukla Trenčín 5:7 (2:2,1:0,2:5)
Motor České Budějovice – Dukla Trenčín 2:3 SN (1:0,1:1,0:1,0:0)
Dukla Jihlava – Sparta Praha 2:3 PP (0:1,1:1,1:0,0:0,0:0,0:1)
Dukla Jihlava – Sparta Praha 5:1 (2:0,1:1,2:0)
Sparta Praha – Dukla Jihlava 4:1 (0:0,2:1,2:0)
Sparta Praha – Dukla Jihlava 5:2 (1:1,1:1,3:0)
Škoda Plzeň – VSŽ Košice 2:3 PP (0:2,2:0,0:0,0:1)
Škoda Plzeň – VSŽ Košice 1:6 (1:3,0:3,0:0) 
VSŽ Košice – Škoda Plzeň 3:1 (1:0,1:1,1:0)

Semifinal 
Tesla Pardubice – Sparta Praha 4:2 (2:1,0:1,2:0)
Tesla Pardubice – Sparta Praha 6:1 (0:1,2:0,4:0)
Sparta Praha – Tesla Pardubice 3:7 (1:0,1:5,1:2)
Dukla Trenčín – VSŽ Košice 8:0 (3:0,3:0,2:0)
Dukla Trenčín – VSŽ Košice 5:3 (2:1,2:1,1:1)
VSŽ Košice – Dukla Trenčín 5:7 (3:3,1:2,1:2)

Final
Tesla Pardubice – Dukla Trenčín 4:3 PP (2:0,1:1,0:2,1:0)
Tesla Pardubice – Dukla Trenčín 3:1 (0:1,3:0,0:0)
Dukla Trenčín – Tesla Pardubice 4:2 (3:1,0:0,1:1)
Dukla Trenčín – Tesla Pardubice 1:4 (0:1,0:2,1:1)

Placing round 

Dukla Jihlava – CHZ Litvínov 10:4 (7:1,1:2,2:1)
Dukla Jihlava – CHZ Litvínov 8:2 (2:1,3:1,3:0)
CHZ Litvínov – Dukla Jihlava 3:5 (1:1,1:2,1:2)

 
Škoda Plzeň – Motor České Budějovice 2:5 (1:3,1:1,0:1)
Škoda Plzeň – Motor České Budějovice 4:6 (2:3,0:1,2:2)
Motor České Budějovice – Škoda Plzeň 3:1 (1:0,0:0,2:1)
9th place
TJ Vítkovice – TJ Gottwaldov 3:4 SN (1:1,2:2,0:0,0:0)
TJ Vítkovice – TJ Gottwaldov 3:6 (1:2,1:4,1:0)
TJ Gottwaldov – TJ Vítkovice 3:6 (0:5,1:0,2:1)
TJ Gottwaldov – TJ Vítkovice 6:5 PP (1:0,4:2,0:3,1:0)
7th place
Škoda Plzeň – CHZ Litvínov 3:6 (1:1,2:2,0:3)
Škoda Plzeň – CHZ Litvínov 6:4 (1:3,2:1,3:0)
CHZ Litvínov – Škoda Plzeň 1:8 (0:3,1:3,0:2)
CHZ Litvínov – Škoda Plzeň 2:7 (0:1,2:3,0:3)
 5th place
Dukla Jihlava – Motor České Budějovice 3:6 (1:3,1:1,1:2)
Dukla Jihlava – Motor České Budějovice 6:2 (1:1,2:0,3:1)
Motor České Budějovice – Dukla Jihlava 6:3 (0:0,3:1,3:2)
Motor České Budějovice – Dukla Jihlava 0:4 (0:1,0:1,0:2)
Dukla Jihlava – Motor České Budějovice 10:7 (1:1,4:1,5:5)
 3rd place
VSŽ Košice – Sparta Praha 3:6 (0:2,1:2,2:2)
VSŽ Košice – Sparta Praha 0:6 (0:3,0:2,0:1)
Sparta Praha – VSŽ Košice 2:3 (1:0,1:1,0:2)
Sparta Praha – VSŽ Košice 4:6 (1:3,1:1,2:2)
VSŽ Košice – Sparta Praha 6:2 (3:1,1:0,2:1)

Relegation round

1. Liga-Qualification

External links
History of Czechoslovak ice hockey

Czechoslovak Extraliga seasons
Czechoslovak
1988–89 in Czechoslovak ice hockey